Daneliya or Danelia (Georgian: დანელია; Kazakh: Данэлия) is a Georgian surname and a Kazakh given name. It may refer to the following people:
Given name
Daneliya Tuleshova (born 2006), Kazakh singer

Surname
 Georgiy Daneliya (1930–2019), Soviet and Russian film director and screenwriter of Georgian origin
Mariam Danelia (born 1994), Georgian chess player
Georgian-language surnames
Surnames of Georgian origin

Kazakh given names
Feminine given names
Surnames of Abkhazian origin